Josip Ćorluka (born 3 March 1995) is a Bosnian professional footballer who plays as a right-back for Bosnian Premier League club Zrinjski Mostar and the Bosnia and Herzegovina national team.

International career
In October 2020, Ćorluka was called up to represent the Bosnia and Herzegovina national team, for a friendly game against Iran and for the 2020–21 UEFA Nations League games against Netherlands and Italy. He debuted in a home loss against Iran on 12 November 2020.

Career statistics

International

Honours
Široki Brijeg
Bosnian Cup: 2016–17

Zrinjski Mostar
Bosnian Premier League: 2021–22

Notes

References

External links

Josip Ćorluka at Sofascore

1995 births
Living people
People from Grude
Croats of Bosnia and Herzegovina
Association football fullbacks
Association football midfielders
Bosnia and Herzegovina footballers
Bosnia and Herzegovina youth international footballers
Bosnia and Herzegovina under-21 international footballers
Bosnia and Herzegovina international footballers
NK Široki Brijeg players
NK Domžale players
HŠK Zrinjski Mostar players
Premier League of Bosnia and Herzegovina players
Slovenian PrvaLiga players
Bosnia and Herzegovina expatriate footballers
Expatriate footballers in Slovenia
Bosnia and Herzegovina expatriate sportspeople in Slovenia